Pepsi Special is a cola flavored soft drink offered in Japan from PepsiCo that contains Dextrin. Suntory, the manufacturer of the beverage claims that the dextrin in the drink suppresses the absorption of fat. The Government of Japan stated that Pepsi Special can benefit those who wish to fight issues with blood pressure or high cholesterol. 

The drink is not available in the United States, and according to Time PepsiCo would likely face legal challenges from the US Food and Drug Administration if the drink was sold in the US.

References

External links
Fat Blocking Pepsi Special: New Soda Hits Stores in Japan (video) ABC News 11/13/2012

Japanese drinks
PepsiCo soft drinks
Suntory